Cambodia competed in the Olympic Games for the first time at the 1956 Summer Olympics.  Because Cambodia decided to join the boycott over the Suez Crisis, the nation did not send any athletes to Melbourne, Australia where all but equestrian events were held in late November, and early December. To accommodate Australia's strict animal quarantine regulations, Dressage, Eventing, and Show Jumping were held in June at Stockholm Olympic Stadium. Two Cambodian riders, Isoup Ganthy, and Saing Pen, competed in the equestrian events.

Equestrian

Show jumping

References
 

Nations at the 1956 Summer Olympics
1956
1956 in Cambodia